The 2006 FIFA Beach Soccer World Cup was an international beach soccer tournament held in Rio de Janeiro, Brazil from 2 November until 12 November 2006. The 16 national teams involved in the tournament were required to register a squad of 12 players; only players in these squads were eligible to take part in the tournament.

Group A

Brazil

Japan

Poland

United States

Group B

France

Canada
Head coach: Ross Ongaro

Iran

Spain

Group C

Portugal

Uruguay

Cameroon

Solomon Islands

Group D

Argentina

Italy

Nigeria

Bahrain

Sources
FIFA Squad Lists 2006

Squads
Beach soccer tournament squads